Eutelsat 12 West B, known as Atlantic Bird 2 prior to 2012 and Eutelsat 8 West A from 2012 to 2015, was a geostationary communications satellite. Operated by Eutelsat, it provides direct-to-home (DTH) broadcasting services from geostationary orbit. The satellite is part of Eutelsat constellation at a longitude of 8° West, then 12.5° West. Eutelsat announced the order of a new Spacebus-3000B2 satellite bus from Alcatel Space in October 2012.

Satellite description 
Atlantic Bird 2 was a  satellite with a design life of 12 years. It is equipped with an S400-12 apogee motor which was used for initial orbit-raising manoeuvres and an S10-18 engine for station keeping burns. The spacecraft has 26 Ku-band transponders.

Launch 
Atlantic Bird 2 was launched on the Ariane 44P launch vehiclen from Centre Spatial Guyanais at the Kourou in French Guiana. Liftoff occurred at 23:21 UTC on 21 September 2001, with the launch vehicle successfully injecting its payload into geosynchronous transfer orbit (GTO). The launch was conducted by Arianespace.

Mission 
Following launch, the satellite Atlantic Bird 2 used its apogee motor to raise itself into geostationary orbit, positioning itself at a longitude of 8° West. In December 2011, Eutelsat announced, that their satellite assets will be renamed under a unified brand name effective from March 2012. This satellite became Eutelsat 8 West A at 8° West. In 2015, it was moved to 12.5° West and named Eutelsat 12 West B. It has been moved to a graveyard orbit in October 2020.

References

External links 
 
 Information about this satellite

Spacecraft launched in 2001
Ariane commercial payloads
Satellites using the Spacebus bus
Eutelsat satellites
Derelict satellites orbiting Earth